William Michael Heckroth (born September 2, 1949) is an American politician. He is a former Iowa State Senator from the 9th District, who as a Democrat served in the Iowa Senate from 2007 to 2011. He owns and is a financial consultant for Financial Architects.

Early life 
Heckroth is a graduate of the University of Iowa, earning a B.S. in Financial Management. While at Iowa, he played baseball; starting out as a walk-on to the Iowa Hawkeyes baseball team.  He later earned 1st Team "All-Big Ten" honors as a pitcher in his senior year, while leading the Hawkeyes to the Big Ten Championship and a berth in the NCAA Division I College World Series in Omaha, Nebraska.

Career 
While serving in the Iowa Senate, Heckroth served on the Economic Growth committee; the Education committee; the Transportation committee; the Commerce Affairs committee, where he was vice chair; and the Rebuild Iowa committee, where he was vice chair.  He also served as vice-chair of the Economic Development Appropriations Subcommittee.

Heckroth was elected in 2006 with 11,902 votes (52%).

References

External links
Senator Bill Heckroth official Iowa Legislature site
Senator Bill Heckroth official Iowa General Assembly site
State Senator Bill Heckroth official constituency site
Bill Heckroth for Iowa State Senate official campaign site

1949 births
Living people
Democratic Party Iowa state senators
Iowa Hawkeyes baseball players
People from Tama County, Iowa
People from Waverly, Iowa